Ice-nine is a fictional solid polymorph of water from Kurt Vonnegut's novel, Cat's Cradle.

Ice-nine may also refer to:

 Ice IX, a form of solid water stable at temperatures below 140 K
 Ice Nine (video game), a first-person shooter video game for the Game Boy Advance
 ICE-9, a fictional computer virus in the American science fiction crime drama television series Person of Interest

Music
 "Ice 9", the second track on Joe Satriani's 1987 album, Surfing with the Alien
 ICE-9 (album), an instrumental album by Susumu Hirasawa
 Kerach 9 (English: Ice 9), an Israeli Rock band
 Lyod 9 (English: Ice 9), a 2001 album by Russian rock band Smyslovye Gallyutsinatsii

See also
 9ice, Nigerian musician, songwriter and dancer
 Ice Nine Kills, an American heavy metal band